Andy Roddick was the defending champion, and won in the final 6–2, 3–6, 6–3, against Roger Federer.

Players

Draw

Main draw

Play-offs

External links
Official AAMI Classic website
2007 AAMI Classic results

Kooyong Classic
AAMI